The first season of the TBS sitcom Men at Work premiered on May 24, 2012 and ended July 12, 2012. A total of ten episodes were produced. Season one regular cast members include Danny Masterson, Michael Cassidy, Adam Busch, Meredith Hagner and James Lesure.

Cast
 Danny Masterson as Milo Foster (10 episodes)
 Michael Cassidy as Tyler Mitchell (10 episodes)
 Adam Busch as Neal Bradford (10 episodes)
 James Lesure as Gibbs (10 episodes)
 Meredith Hagner as Amy Jordan (6 episodes)

Recurring
 Amy Smart as Lisa (2 episodes)
 J. K. Simmons as P.J. Jordan (1 episode)
 Stephanie Lemelin as Rachel (1 episode)
 Joel David Moore as Doug (1 episode)

Production
On January 6, 2012, TBS picked up Men at Work for a first season of 10 episodes set to premiere on May 24, 2012 at 10 pm. Production on the first season began in April 2012.

Guest stars for season one of Men at Work include, Amy Smart as Lisa, Milo's ex-girlfriend; Julian Morris as Damien; J. K. Simmons as P.J. Jordan, Amy's father and owner of the magazine; Melissa Claire Egan as Jessica, Milo's date; Ethan Suplee as Dan; Stacy Keibler as Keri; Kathy Najimy as Sasha Ryan, a well-known sex blogger; Josh Hopkins as Ryan, a friend of Amy's who is blind; Kevin Pollak as Pavel; Christopher Masterson as a hotel employee; Wilmer Valderrama as  	Eri Ricaldo; Alexandra Breckenridge as Katelyn, a young woman who keeps blowing off her dates with Tyler; Joel David Moore as Doug, a Full Steam Magazine editor; Laura Prepon as Hannah, Neal's friend who is set up with Milo; William Baldwin as Shepard Peters, a famous, free-spirited, sexually driven photographer, and Richard Riehle as Gus, a man who mistakes Milo for his long-lost war hero family member.

Episodes

DVD release

References

External links 

2012 American television seasons